Copelatus lineatus is a species of diving beetle. It is part of the genus Copelatus in the subfamily Copelatinae of the family Dytiscidae. It was described by Félix Édouard Guérin-Méneville in 1838.

References

lineatus
Beetles described in 1838